Flying Blind is the debut Studio album by Irish singer Niamh Kavanagh. It was released in November 1995.

Track listing

Release history

References 

1995 debut albums